Yvon Delbos (7 May 1885 – 15 November 1956) was a French Radical-Socialist Party politician and minister.

Delbos was born in Thonac, Dordogne, and entered a career as a journalist, and became a member of the Radical-Socialist Party. He subsequently served as Minister of Education (1925), Minister of Justice (1936), and notably as Minister of Foreign Affairs in the Popular Front governments of Léon Blum and Camille Chautemps.

In January 1937, unveiling a war memorial at Châteauroux, Delbos, in reply to Hitler's Reichstag speech of the previous day, emphasised the need for Franco-German understanding and for both countries to find new markets so that industrial expansion might replace rearmament. After representing France at the Nine-Power Conference at Brussels on 3 November, he expounded French Foreign Policy in a debate in the Chamber on 18–19 November, emphasizing Anglo-French friendship and the necessity for its maintenance. Ten days later, he visited London with Chautemps to receive a report from Neville Chamberlain and Anthony Eden on the result of the Halifax-Hitler talks. Afterwards, he set out on a tour of the central and eastern European capitols, visiting Warsaw on 3 December, Bucharest on 8 December, Belgrade on 12 December and Prague on 15 December, in each case discussing the European situation with the ministers of the countries in question, and seeking to foster friendly relations with France.

On 10 December 1937 it was announced that a plot to assassinate him at Prague had been discovered by the French Police and the prospective assailant was arrested. He was reappointed Foreign Minister in the reconstructed Chautemps government in the third week of January 1938 but was excluded from Léon Blum's cabinet in March 1938.

During the Spanish Civil War, he worked alongside his British counterpart Anthony Eden in fleshing out the policy of nonintervention.

References

Bibliography
 Benoît Cazenave, Yvon Delbos, in Hier war das Ganze Europa, Stiftung Brandenburgische Gedenkstätte, Editions Metropol Verlag, Berlin 2004.

External links
 

1885 births
1956 deaths
People from Dordogne
Politicians from Nouvelle-Aquitaine
Radical Party (France) politicians
French Ministers of National Education
Government ministers of France
Members of the 13th Chamber of Deputies of the French Third Republic
Members of the 14th Chamber of Deputies of the French Third Republic
Members of the 15th Chamber of Deputies of the French Third Republic
Members of the 16th Chamber of Deputies of the French Third Republic
Members of the Constituent Assembly of France (1945)
Members of the Constituent Assembly of France (1946)
Deputies of the 1st National Assembly of the French Fourth Republic
Deputies of the 2nd National Assembly of the French Fourth Republic
French Senators of the Fourth Republic
Senators of Dordogne
École Normale Supérieure alumni
French military personnel of World War I
Recipients of the Order of the White Eagle (Poland)